Stephen M. Khan  (born 1966 or 1967) is a Canadian politician who was an elected member to the Legislative Assembly of Alberta representing the electoral district of St. Albert. He was a member of the Progressive Conservative caucus. He was minister responsible for Service Alberta in the cabinet of Jim Prentice.

He was defeated by Marie Renaud of the New Democrats in the 2015 Alberta general election.

He later joined the Alberta Party.

Electoral history

References

Progressive Conservative Association of Alberta MLAs
Living people
People from St. Albert, Alberta
Members of the Executive Council of Alberta
Year of birth uncertain
21st-century Canadian politicians
Canadian politicians of Pakistani descent
Alberta Party politicians
Year of birth missing (living people)